The 2006 IBAF Intercontinental Cup was held in Taichung, Taiwan from November 9 through the 19th.  Eight countries contested the tournament, which was played at Taichung Baseball Field and the newly built Taichung Intercontinental Baseball Stadium.  The participating countries were Cuba, Australia, Italy, the Netherlands, Japan, South Korea, the Philippines in addition to the hosts from Chinese Taipei (Taiwan).  The tournament was sanctioned by the International Baseball Federation.

Round robin

The eight teams will play a round-robin format in which they will each play the other teams once.  This means that each team will play seven games in this first phase of the tournament over the course of eight days.

1 Game called due to bad weather condition.
2 Dutch manager ejected in the top of the eleventh for obscenities in argument with an umpire.

TF = Taichung Baseball Field
IBC = Intercontinental Baseball Stadium

Table

DI=Innings played on defense
RA/9DI=Runs allowed for every nine defensive innings played
Tiebreaker
head-to-head
RA/9DI
Notes
Cuba wins tiebreaker over Japan based on head-to-head result
South Korea wins tiebreaker over Italy based on head-to-head result

Classification round

The teams that finish in fifth through eighth place in the round robin will face off in the consolation round.  All consolation round matches will be played at Taichung Baseball Field.

Medal round

The top four teams from the round robin will enter the medal round of the competition.  All medal round games will be played at the Intercontinental Baseball Stadium.

Final line score

Final standings

Trivia
This tournament marks the official opening of Taichung Intercontinental Baseball Stadium
Asia's big three teams are all short-handed as 2006 Taiwan Series champions La New Bears, Japan Series champions Hokkaido Nippon Ham Fighters, and South Korea champions Samsung Lions are all participating in the 2006 Konami Cup Asia Series in Tokyo, Japan, which started on the same day.

See also
Intercontinental Cup (baseball)
 List of sporting events in Taiwan

External links
Official website (Traditional Chinese)
 

Intercontinental Cup (baseball)
Sport in Taichung
Intercontinental Cup
Intercontinental Cup
2006
Intercontinental Cup